Spartan Air Lines Ltd was a British private airline company, in the period 1933–1935. In 1933, it started operating passenger services from the London area to the Isle of Wight. In late 1935 it merged with United Airways Ltd to form British Airways Ltd.

History
Spartan Air Lines Ltd was formed on 2 February 1933, as a subsidiary of Spartan Aircraft Ltd, to develop the use of its product the Spartan Cruiser. The company was financed by Whitehall Securities Ltd, and services to the Isle of Wight were to be operated in co-operation with private railway companies. The managing director was W.D.L. Roberts, with Harold Balfour and Alliott Verdon-Roe as fellow directors, and Mr P.W. Lynch-Blosse as chief pilot.

On 12 April 1933, the first service was started from Heston Aerodrome to Somerton (Cowes West) Aerodrome, Cowes, Isle of Wight, using three Spartan Cruisers.

After a winter break in scheduled operations, the airline moved to Croydon Aerodrome for the summer 1934 season, in collaboration with Railway Air Services.

In April 1935, Spartan Air Lines returned to Heston, operating services to both Cowes and Bembridge, again in collaboration with Railway Air Services. A sister company in the Spartan group, United Airways Ltd, had been formed in 1934 to operate connecting services from Heston to Hall Caine Airport, Isle of Man via Stanley Park Aerodrome (Blackpool) for the 1935 season.

On 30 September 1935, Spartan Air Lines and United Airways Limited merged to form Allied British Airways Ltd, which on 29 October 1935 was renamed British Airways Ltd. The new airline started operations on 1 January 1936, initially based at Heston.

Fleet

From Jackson (1974), Doyle (2002)

Notes

References
Doyle, Neville. 2002. The Triple Alliance: The Predecessors of the first British Airways. Air-Britain. 
Halpenny, Bruce B. (1992). Action Station Vol.8: Military Airfields of Greater London. 
Jackson, A.J. (1974). British Civil Aircraft since 1919 Volume 3. London: Putnam. .
Jackson, A.J. (1988). British Civil Aircraft since 1919 Volume 3. London: Putnam. .
Sherwood, Tim. Coming in to Land: A Short History of Hounslow, Hanworth and Heston Aerodromes 1911–1946. Heritage Publications (1999) 

Airlines established in 1933
Defunct airlines of the United Kingdom
Airlines disestablished in 1935
1933 establishments in England
1935 disestablishments in England
1935 mergers and acquisitions